Casa Amatller is a building in the Modernisme style in Barcelona, Catalunya, Spain, designed by renowned Catalan architect Josep Puig i Cadafalch. Along with Casa Batlló and Casa Lleó-Morera, it makes up the three most important buildings in Barcelona's famous Illa de la Discòrdia ("Block of Discord"), noted for its unique, contrasting modern buildings.

The building was originally constructed in 1875, then redesigned as a residence for wealthy chocolatier and archaeological enthusiast Antoni Amatller between 1898 and 1900. After his death in 1910, it remained the home of Amatller's daughter until her death in 1960. The continuous ownership by the Amatller family meant that the house's interior of 1900 has remained largely preserved intact to the present day. It now serves as a historic house museum, café, and the Amatller Institute for Hispanic Art, a scholarly study center. The house is regularly open for scheduled tours.

Gallery

See also
 List of Modernisme buildings in Barcelona

External links

Official City of Barcelona Site
Casa Amatller at Tot Passejant (Catalan)

Passeig de Gràcia
Eixample
Buildings and structures in Barcelona
Josep Puig i Cadafalch buildings
Modernisme architecture in Barcelona
Art Nouveau houses
Houses in Catalonia
Palaces in Barcelona
Catalonia
Houses completed in 1900
Modernisme
Modernisme architecture